Long Live Freedom is a 2013 Italian comedy-drama film directed by Roberto Andò. It won the Nastro d'Argento for Best Screenplay and the David di Donatello for Best Script and the David di Donatello for Best Supporting Actor to Valerio Mastandrea.

Plot 
Enrico Oliveri is a shrewd, experienced politician, a senator and party leader of the center-left whose career is in decline. His party is currently in  opposition and by all projections is headed for another defeat in the upcoming elections. Members of his party want to dump him. Suffering depression and exhaustion, he decides to disappear for a while, hiding incognito in Paris, France at the home of a former lover, Danielle, who is now married to a famous film director by whom she has a school-age daughter.

Panic ensues among Oliveri's political intimates when they discover his disappearance. His right-hand man, Andrea Bottini, does not lose faith, but instead gets the idea of secretly substituting Oliveri's twin brother, Giovanni Ernani, an over-the-top writer and philosopher who has previously spent time in mental health care and is still medicated. Complications ensue, but the substitute proves more outgoing, more visionary, and much more popular with the press, the public and even with his competitors than his more serious brother, and he leads the party towards victory. The real senator rediscovers himself while watching his brother's success from afar through the French newspapers as he himself dallies in the arms of lovers. Enrico Oliveri eventually returns to Rome, but the film ends in ambiguity.

Context 
The backdrop of the film is the depiction of a despair bordering on self-loathing of much of the Italian electorate at Italian economic conditions and the austerity regimen imposed by the European Union. A "Chancellor" obviously intended to be Angela Merkel appears in the film without being named. While some have found the film somewhat lightweight, an extended quotation from Berthold Brecht placed in the mouth of the mad brother reveals the director's intent: when politicians and political institutions fail, only the spirit and individual efforts of the people can rescue a nation from crisis.

Cast 
 Toni Servillo: Enrico Oliveri/Giovanni Ernani
 Valerio Mastandrea: Andrea Bottini
 Valeria Bruni Tedeschi: Danielle
 Michela Cescon: Anna
 Anna Bonaiuto: Evelina Pileggi
 Eric Nguyen: Mung
 Judith Davis: Mara
 Andrea Renzi: De Bellis
 Massimo De Francovich: President of Republic 
 Renato Scarpa: Arrighi 
 Gianrico Tedeschi: Furlan

Production and Distribution 
The movie was produced by BiBi Film and RAI Cinema. The post-production was carried out by Reset VFX S.r.l..
The distribution of the movie is by 01 Distribution.

References

External links

2013 films
Italian comedy-drama films
2013 comedy-drama films
Films directed by Roberto Andò